Tom Bruce may refer to:

 Tom Bruce (cricketer) (born 1991), New Zealand cricketer
 Tom Bruce (rugby league) (1885–1917), Australian rugby league footballer
 Tom Bruce (swimmer) (born 1952), American swimmer
 Thomas R. Bruce, Legal Information Institute founder